Mir so nah ("So Close to Me") is the third studio album by German singer Cassandra Steen. It was released by Universal Music Urban on 29 April 2011 in German-speaking Europe. The album became Steen's second consecutive top ten album, peaking at number five on the German Albums Chart.

Track listing

Notes
 denotes co-producer

Charts

Release history

References

External links
 CassandraSteen.de — official website

2011 albums
German-language albums
Cassandra Steen albums